Buffered charcoal yeast extract (BCYE) agar is a selective growth medium used to culture or grow certain types of bacteria, particularly the Gram-negative species Legionella pneumophila. It has also been used for the laboratory diagnosis of Acanthamoeba keratitis, Francisella and Nocardia.

This culture is to be differentiated from regular yeast extract agar, which is not selective.

References

Cell culture media